Prothyma rapillyi is a species of tiger beetle in the subgenus Genoprothyma endemic to Thailand.

References

Cicindelidae
Insects of Thailand

Endemic fauna of Thailand